Governor Eaton may refer to:

Benjamin Harrison Eaton (1833–1904), 4th Governor of Colorado
Horace Eaton (1804–1855), 18th Governor of Vermont
John Eaton (politician) (1790–1856), Governor of Florida Territory
Theophilus Eaton (died 1658), Governor of the New Haven Colony from 1639 to 1658

See also
Governor Easton (disambiguation)